The second season of Muodin huipulle (Finnish, "Project Runway") began airing on Finland's MTV3 on 22 February 2011 at 20.00. The show is hosted by model Nora Vilva and designer Janne Renvall is the contestants' mentor. Jaakko Selin, mentor in season one, is one of the regular judges.

The winner of Muodin huipulle'' will receive €40,000 worth of PR and management services by Huippu Design Management, a spot in Helsinki Design Week and an editorial spread in Olivia.

Contestants

Designers

In order of elimination:

(ages listed are the designers' ages at the time the show was taped in 2010)

Models
Hiu (with Essi before episode 6, now with Mari)
Kerttu (with Anne-Mari before episode 6, now with Reta)
Jessica (with Caterina before her elimination)
Elina (with Jussi before episode 6, now with Linda)
Elisabeth (with Jarna before her elimination)
Nina (with Paula before her elimination)
Taru (with Harriet before episode 6, now eliminated)
Tinja (with Leni before episode 6, now eliminated)
Elena (with Linda before episode 6, now with Suvi)
Emilia (with Wille before his elimination)
Siiri (with Mari before episode 6, now with Jussi)
Jasmin (with Reta before episode 6, now with Essi)
Leila (with Tuomas before episode 6, now with Harriet)
Lotta (with Suvi before episode 6, now with Leni)

Challenges

 The designer won Muodin huipulle.
 The designer won the challenge.
 The designer had one of the highest scores for that challenge, but did not win.
 The designer had one of the lowest scores for that challenge, but was not eliminated.
 The designer was in the bottom two, but was not eliminated.
 The designer lost and was out of the competition.
 The designer was eliminated in a double elimination.

: There was no specified one winner, the entire team won the challenge.

Episode summaries

Episode 1: Designer's Philosophy
At the opening party, the designers must locate the fabric for the upcoming first challenge. The designers are asked to design an outfit that depicts their design philosophy. Midway through the challenge, the designers were asked to swap fabrics by rotation.

Guest Judges: Katri Niskanen and Sami Sykkö
WINNER: Linda
OUT: Paula
First Aired: 22 February 2011

Episode 2: Spring is in the Air! (Kevät ilmassa!)
The designers must design an outfit that must be at least 1/3 flowers that evokes the spring season. The designers are not allowed to use sewing machines in this challenge.

Guest Judge: Teemu Muurimäki
WINNER: Jussi
OUT: Jarna
First Aired: 1 March 2011

Episode 3: Welcome to the Workshop! (Tervetuloa konepajalle!)
The designers are brought to a factory workshop to get inspiration to make a collection of outfits 
for business women in a team challenge. Each team is given €300 for fabric and 8 hours to complete the project.

The teams (leaders in bold):
Jussi, Suvi and Linda
Mari, Essi and Ville
Tuomas, Leni and Reta
Harriet, Caterina and Anne-Mari

Guest Judge: Arman Alizad
WINNER: Jussi, Suvi and Linda
OUT: Ville and Caterina
First Aired: 8 March 2011

Episode 4: Haute Couture Dress in White
The designers must design an haute couture dress that is white. During the process, we learn that Mari had no idea who John Galliano was, but she won the challenge anyway!

Guest Judge: Tiia Vanhatapio
WINNER: Mari
OUT: Anne-Mari
First Aired: 15 March 2011

Episode 5: New Life, New Style (Uusi elämä, uusi tyyli)
The designers must make dresses that are suitable for a summer party. Their models are regular people who have lost a considerable amount of weight and must use an old garment as some of the material for the new outfit.

Guest Judge: Janina Fry
WINNER: Linda
OUT: Tuomas
First Aired: 22 March 2011

Episode 6: Art Work Outfit (Pue taide työasuksi)
The designers visit the Espoo Museum of Modern Art for inspiration for their art work outfit. Midway through the challenge, Nora invites the designers to switch models.

Guest Judges: Nana Salin and Ritva Falla
WINNER: Suvi
OUT: Mari
First Aired: 29 March 2011

Episode 7: Musiikki ja mallit sekoittavat pakkaa(Music and mixing models pack)
The models reveal the inspirations for their designers one by one, which all turn out to be music genres. Additionally, the designers need not shop for fabric, since the models picked it out for them.

Suvi - Heavy Metal,
Harriet - Techno,
Linda - Argentine Tango,
Jussi - Country,
Essi - Reggae,
Reta - Folk Music,
Leni - Surf.

Guest Judge: Kaarina Kivilahti
WINNER: Reta
OUT: Essi
First Aired: 5 April 2011

Episode 8: Streetwear-asu(Streetwear outfit)
The designers are brought to a library to garner inspiration for their streetwear outfit.

Guest Judges: Kirsimari Kärkkäinen and Tomi Freeman
WINNER: Linda
OUT: Suvi
First Aired: 12 April 2011

Episode 9: 2015-Trendejä(2015 Trends)
The designers must design an outfit that projects the trends on 2015. Part of their materials comes from their submissions for the first challenge.

Guest Judges: Sanna Sierilä and Minttu Vesala
WINNER: Jussi
OUT: Harriet
First Aired: 19 April 2011

Episode 10: Hääpuku(Wedding)
The designers are brought to a hotel where they must absorb the atmosphere and contemplate their two wedding outfits: one being the wedding dress, and the other being a complementary night outfit. The judging session, given the non-Finnish guest judge, took place in English.

Guest Judge: Efva Attling
WINNER: Linda
OUT: Reta
First Aired: 26 April 2011

Episode 12: Lopullinen (Finale)

Show a collection of nine pieces.

Guest Judges: Eva Krus and two others.
WINNER: Linda
RUNNER-UP: Leni

References

External links
MTV3 homepage (in Finnish)
Muodin huipulle homepage

2011 Finnish television seasons
Season 02
2011 in fashion

fi:Muodin huipulle